Carpophyllum is a genus of brown algae belonging to the family Sargassaceae.

Species:

Carpophyllum angustifolium 
Carpophyllum elongatum 
Carpophyllum flexuosum 
Carpophyllum japonicum 
Carpophyllum longifolium 
Carpophyllum macrophyllum 
Carpophyllum maschalocarpum 
Carpophyllum phyllanthum 
Carpophyllum plumosum 
Carpophyllum scalare 
Carpophyllum serratum

References

Fucales
Fucales genera